Alpár Jegenyés (born 31 July 1958 in Pécs) is a former Hungarian handball player who competed in the 1980 Summer Olympics.

In 1980 he was part of the Hungarian team which finished fourth in the Olympic tournament. He played three matches.

He is living in Emsdetten in Germany where he has a shop that sells Hungarian food and wine.  He is also the coach of the second adult handball-team of the TV Emsdetten, whose first team is playing within the 1. Bundesliga of Germany.

References

1958 births
Handball players at the 1980 Summer Olympics
Hungarian male handball players
Living people
Olympic handball players of Hungary
Sportspeople from Pécs